Koby Arthur Koomson is a Ghanaian diplomat. He served as Ghana's Ambassador to the United States of America from 1997 to 2001.

Biography 
Koomson was born in May 1951 in Gold Coast (now Ghana). He had his secondary education at Ghana National College and his tertiary education at Arkansas State University. He served as Ghana's Ambassador to the United States of America from 7 November 1997 to 2 November 2001.

See also 

 Embassy of Ghana in Washington, D.C.

References 

Ambassadors of Ghana to the United States
Ghanaian diplomats
1951 births
Living people
Ghana National College alumni